Huellelhue is a river in San Juan de la Costa commune in southern Chile. It runs from east to west and discharges into the Pacific Ocean about 10 km south of Maicolpue.

Rivers of Chile
Rivers of Los Lagos Region